Food City or Food Town were Canadian supermarkets operated by the Toronto-based Oshawa Group. The stores were often paired with department store chain Towers.

A typical Food City store had:

 Meats/Deli
 Produce
 Frozen goods
 Canned goods

The stores employed a plastic numbered basket system at the checkout that would be placed onto rollers and/or a conveyor and then is loaded by staff at a drive-through.  This system, which is becoming increasingly rare, is commonly referred to as parcel pickup or car order.

Smaller stores were re-branded as Food Town; the Food City name disappeared after the sale of the parent company to Sobeys in 1998. Many of the locations became Price Chopper stores, currently known as FreshCo.

See also
List of Canadian supermarkets

Retail companies disestablished in 1998
Defunct supermarkets of Canada